The Third River, also known as the Yantecaw River (possibly from Munsee yu wandakw, "here this way"), is the third (upstream) main tributary of the Passaic River in Passaic and Essex Counties, New Jersey in the United States.

The river originates in the Great Notch Reservoir in Woodland Park, New Jersey. It then runs through the towns of Little Falls, Clifton and Montclair.  It then goes into Clifton a second time, runs through Bloomfield, through the grounds of the Upper Montclair Country Club, and then the Glen Ridge Country Club. After this, it runs by Bloomfield's North Middle School where it forms Clarks Pond which is used by the school's science classes to help teach biology. It then passes through Bloomfield's Brookside Park which was the location of a mill in the Colonial Period. It also passes next to Foley Field which is used by the Bloomfield High School football team and the town's little league baseball teams.  The river then runs through multiple parks in the town of Nutley in Essex County.  It enters the Passaic River in Clifton just north of the border with Nutley.

See also
List of rivers of New Jersey

References

External links
U.S. Geological Survey: NJ stream gaging stations

Rivers of Essex County, New Jersey
Rivers of Passaic County, New Jersey
Tributaries of the Passaic River
Rivers of New Jersey